Shlomo Kramer, is an Israeli information technology entrepreneur and investor. He is the co-founder of cyber-security companies Check Point and Imperva, as well as Cato Networks, a cloud-based network security provider.

Personal life
Shlomo Kramer has been actively involved with technology all his life. As a youth, he worked on mainframes and sold video games. He landed his first job – selling personal computers at a Tel Aviv shop – at age 15. After discovering that one of the shop's best-selling games was developed and marketed by a 17-year-old in Britain who had set up his own company, Kramer knew that he "wanted to be like him – an entrepreneur, even though it would be quite a few years before I knew the word."

Kramer served in the Israel Defense Forces’ Unit 8200, a crack cybersecurity and intelligence team whose operations include gathering, analyzing and decrypting data; over the years, the unit has produced many of Israel’s top high-tech entrepreneurs. After completing his military service, Kramer earned a master’s degree in Computer Science from the Hebrew University of Jerusalem and a bachelor’s degree in Mathematics and Computer Science from Tel Aviv University.

Career
Kramer, who has been called "the godfather of Israeli cybersecurity," is a serial high-tech investor and entrepreneur with "a long track record of success". He founded his first startup during high school in the 1980's along with Ofer Shemtov, and the company was later sold to a software firm. In 1993, he co-founded Check Point Software Technologies along with Gil Shwed and Marius Nacht; the company introduced the first firewall to the commercial market and went on to become "a world leader in protecting the information that flows round the Internet, and a flagship of Israel's high-tech industry". Kramer left Check Point in 1998 and used the money from the sale of his stake to strike out on his own as an entrepreneur and investor in numerous startups.

In 2002, Kramer founded his second startup, Imperva, together with Mickey Boodaei and Amichai Shulman.  Imperva moved away from perimeter defenses such as firewalls and instead deployed its software to protect against hackers and business-data theft by identifying and preventing attacks before they find their way to the inside of an organization.

The company's initial public offering on the New York Stock Exchange raised $90 million, with its shares gaining 33% on its first day of trading on 9 November 2011. In 2014, Imperva acquired Skyfence, a cloud security gateway startup in which Kramer was a lead investor, and bought the shares it did not already own in Incapsula, a cloud-based website performance and security service in which it had already invested. The acquisitions helped Imperva extend its data security strategy throughout the cloud.

Kramer's belief in the cloud as the next big development in cybersecurity led him to establish Cato Networks in 2015, together with former Imperva colleague Gur Shatz. Kramer acted as the Cato Network's CEO since its inception. Cato Networks’ software integrates all the elements of an organization's network – including branch locations, data centers, mobile users and more – into one encrypted network in the cloud. This means the enterprise is no longer tied to an array of location-bound appliances to protect its data.

Investments
In addition to co-founding Check Point, Imperva and Cato Networks, Kramer has invested in many companies and startups including Palo Alto Networks, Exabeam, Trusteer, WatchDox and LightCyber, mostly in the field of data security.

Awards and honors
In 2006, Kramer was selected by Network World magazine as one of 20 luminaries who changed the network industry. In 2008, he was named CEO of the Year by SC Magazine. In 2013, Kramer was inducted into the Infosecurity Europe Hall of Fame.

Other Interests
Based in Israel, Kramer enjoys deep-sea diving and photography. He was a weightlifting champion in his youth.

See also
 Silicon Wadi
 Science and technology in Israel

References

External links
 Cato Networks

Living people
Businesspeople in software
Israeli chief executives
Israeli investors
Israeli Jews
People from Tel Aviv
Technology company founders
Israeli company founders
Year of birth missing (living people)